The World Flute Society (WFS), a successor to the International Native American Flute Association, is a non-profit organization dedicated to "musical and cultural expressions of the world's indigenous and folk flute traditions."
WFS has a particular emphasis on the study and development of the Native American flute.

Its primary activities include organizing music-oriented conferences and workshops, production of printed and audio materials, and the publication of the newsletter Overtones.

The advisory board comprises Mary Youngblood, Peter Phippen, Dr. Andra Bohnet, Xavier Quijas Yxayotl of Guadalajara, Kevin Locke, and G. S. Sachdev. The Scholar-in-Residence is Michael Graham Allen (Coyote Oldman).

The WFS is based in Lead, South Dakota, United States.

See also
Native American flute

References

External links
 World Flute Society: Official web site

Music education organizations
Music organizations based in the United States
Flute organizations
Non-profit organizations based in Suffolk, Virginia
Native American arts organizations